Aeneas Tacticus (fl. 4th century BC) was one of the earliest Greek writers on the art of war and is credited as the first author to provide a complete guide to securing military communications. Polybius described his design for a hydraulic semaphore system.

According to Aelianus Tacticus and Polybius, he wrote a number of treatises on the subject.  The only extant one, How to Survive under Siege, deals with the best methods of defending a fortified city. An epitome of the whole was made by Cineas, minister of Pyrrhus, king of Epirus. The work is chiefly valuable as containing a large number of historical illustrations.

Aeneas was considered by Isaac Casaubon to have been a contemporary of Xenophon and identical with the Arcadian general Aeneas of Stymphalus, whom Xenophon (Hellenica, vii.3) mentions as fighting at the Battle of Mantinea (362 BC).

References

Further reading
Aeneas Tacticus, Asclepiodotus, Onasander. Translated by Illinois Greek Club. Loeb Classical Library. 
 Whitehead, David. 2002, Aineias the Tactician: How to Survive Under Siege. Second edition (First edition 1990). Bristol Classical Press. .
 Jenkins, Thomas E. 2006. "Epistolary Warfare" in Intercepted Letters: Epistolarity and Narrative in Greek and Roman Literature. Lexington Books. pp. 51–59. .''
 Kai Brodersen: Aineias/Aeneas Tacticus. Poliorketika (Tusculum). Greek and German. De Gruyter, Berlin / Boston 2017, .
See also Chisholm 1911 for a long list of editions and commentaries.

External links
 Aeneas Tacticus (complete text, Greek and English translation)
 How to Survive Under Siege


Ancient Greek military writers
4th-century BC Greek people
Year of birth unknown
Year of death unknown
Siege warfare